The 2020 United States Olympic trials for track and field were staged in Eugene, Oregon, having been moved from the initially selected Hilmer Lodge Stadium in Walnut, California. This was first major event for the redesigned and rebuilt Hayward Field.

Organized by USA Track and Field and TrackTown USA, the ten-day competition was originally scheduled for June 19–28, 2020, but was rescheduled to June 18–27, 2021 due to the COVID-19 pandemic and the postponement of the 2020 Summer Olympics to 2021. It is serving as the national championships in track and field for the United States.

The results of the event determined qualification for the American Olympic team at the 2020 Summer Olympics, to be held in Tokyo. Provided they had achieved the Olympic standard or are in the World Athletics ranking quota, the top three athletes in each event gained a place on the Olympic team. In the event that a leading athlete did not hold the standard, or an athlete withdrew, the next highest finishing athlete with the standard was selected instead. USA Track and Field announced their Olympic roster based on these guidelines on July 6, 2021.

The trials for the men's and women's marathon were held on February 29, 2020 in Atlanta and the trials for the men's 50 km race walk were held on January 25, 2020 at San Diego Christian College and the Santee Town Center station in Santee, California.

Multiple rising high school and collegiate track athletes such as Nico Young, Erriyon Knighton, Hobbs Kessler, and Sha'Carri Richardson participated in the trials. Multiple world-leads, US records, and world records were broken during the trials such as Sydney McLaughlin's 400m hurdles WR of 51.90 during the finals, Erriyon Knighton's U-18 and U-20 200m record of 19.84 in the finals, and Ryan Crouser's shot put WR of 23.37m.

Men's results
Key:

Men track events

Men field events

Women's results
Key:
.

Women track events

Women field events

Notes
 Sha'Carri Richardson was not selected for the Olympic team after testing positive for THC. While her 30-day suspension would expire before the 4 x 100 metres relay event, Richardson was also not named to the relay pool. Fourth-placed Jenna Prandini was instead selected for the event.	
 Sha'Carri Richardson was not selected for the Olympic team after testing positive for THC. While her 30-day suspension would expire before the 4 x 100 metres relay event, Richardson was also not named to the relay pool. Fourth-placed Jenna Prandini was instead selected for the event.
 Brianna McNeal was suspended for five years for an anti-doping rule violation (missed tests). While she was allowed to compete at the trials pending appeal, her suspension was later upheld. Fourth-placed Gabbi Cunningham was instead named to the Olympic team.
 Neither McPherson nor Greene achieved the Olympic standard or a qualifying world ranking. In addition to Cunningham, USATF selected fourth-placed Rachel McCoy who previously achieved the Olympic standard, and Tynita Butts, who did not reach the finals but held a qualifying ranking of #21.
 Hazlewood had not achieved the Olympic standard or a qualifying world ranking. Fourth place Kelsey Card, who had a qualifying ranking of #23, was instead selected.
 Allgood-Whetstone had not achieved the Olympic standard or a qualifying world ranking. Fourth place Ariana Ince, who had a qualifying ranking of #16, was instead selected.

Schedule

Qualification
USA Track & Field sets minimum performances standards for entry into the national championships. In order to merit entry into the championships, an athlete must meet that standard, or better, within a set time frame prior to the competition.

All qualifying performances for the U.S. Olympic trials must be attained on a standard outdoor track in the period
 Wednesday, May 1, 2019 through Sunday, June 6, 2021,

or on an indoor track, in the same event, in the period 
 Wednesday, January 1, 2020 through Sunday, June 6, 2021;

except for the 10,000 meters, Decathlon & Heptathlon and 20 km Race Walks, whose qualifying period is from 
 Tuesday, January 1, 2019 through Sunday, June 6, 2021.

The qualifying performance for the men's 50 km Race walk must be attained in the period 
 Monday January 1, 2018 through Sunday, January 12, 2020.

There are also automatic qualifying criteria outside of the entry standards. Athletes who are the reigning indoor or outdoor national champion are automatically qualified to enter that event.

Qualifying marks must be attained in a 2020 U.S. Olympic trials event. No qualifying marks will be allowed using alternate events, except for the men's Mile run as follows: An appeal to use a Mile qualifying mark for the 1500 will be accepted only if the mile mark was made during the 2020 season, from Wednesday, January 1, 2020 through Sunday, June 6, 2021, and the mark is 3:54.00 or better.

For events over distances from 100 m to 800 m, performances will only be accepted if fully automatic timing (FAT) is used. For performances beyond that distance, FAT times are also used, but in the event that the athlete has not recorded a FAT performance, a manually recorded time may be used. There will be no adjustment for marks made at altitude. Wind-assisted performances will not be accepted for 2020 U.S. Olympic trials qualifying.

References

Results
2020 U.S. Olympic Team trials - Track & Field - 6/19/2020 to 6/28/2020 Walnut, California Results. USA Track & Field. Retrieved on 2020-06-28.
Main website Results page
2021 United States Olympic trials (track and field) results USATF

Notes

External links
Official webpage at USATF

USA Outdoor Track and Field Championships
US Olympic Trials
Track, Outdoor
United States Summer Olympics Trials
United States Olympic trials
United States Olympic trials
United States Olympic trials